Physalis caudella, the southwestern groundcherry or tomatillo chiquito, is a plant in the family Solanaceae, native to Arizona, Sonora and Chihuahua. The purple-green fruits are small but edible.

References

caudella
Edible Solanaceae
Flora of Arizona
Flora of Chihuahua (state)
Flora of Sonora
Plants used in Native American cuisine